Actinocentra is a genus of moths belonging to the subfamily Olethreutinae of the family Tortricidae, with a single species.

Species
Actinocentra aliena Diakonoff, 1973

See also
List of Tortricidae genera

References

External links
tortricidae.com

Tortricidae genera
Monotypic moth genera
Olethreutinae
Taxa named by Alexey Diakonoff